The Dow Jones Open Invitational was a golf tournament on the PGA Tour that was played for one year at the Upper Montclair Country Club in Clifton, New Jersey, an 18-hole, par-72 championship course. Another PGA Tour event — the Thunderbird Classic — had also been held there for part of its history in the 1960s.

Winners

References

Former PGA Tour events
Golf in New Jersey
Sports in Passaic County, New Jersey
1970 in New Jersey